Abernathy may refer to:

Places in the United States 
 Abernathy, Alabama, an unincorporated community
 Abernathy, Texas, a city

Other uses
 Abernathy (surname)
 Abernathy High School, Abernathy, Texas
 Abernathy Field, Pulaski, Tennessee, United States, an airport
 Abernathy Municipal Airport, Hale County, Texas
 Abernathy Field Station, Pennsylvania, an outdoor classroom for Washington & Jefferson College

See also
 Abernethy (disambiguation)